Sir William Erle PC QC FRS (1 October 179328 January 1880) was an English lawyer, judge and Whig politician.

Early career
Born at Fifehead Magdalen, Dorset, William was the son of the Rev. Christopher Erle of Gillingham, Dorset and  Margaret née Bowles, a relative of the poet William Lisle Bowles. His younger brother Peter Erle went on to be a Charity Commissioner. Erle was educated at Winchester College and at New College, Oxford where he graduated BCL in 1818 and held a fellowship until 1834. Having been called to the Bar at the Middle Temple on 26 November 1819 he went on the western circuit. Here he slowly acquired a reputation for thoroughness, rather than brilliance, and a fair share of remunerative practice. He was admitted ad eundem a member of the Inner Temple on 11 June 1822, and became a bencher of that society on 18 November 1834, and in 1844, Treasurer. He also purchased a warrant as counsel at the Palace Court which had jurisdiction in all private law actions within 12 miles (19 km) of Whitehall.

In 1834, he married Amelia, eldest daughter of the Rev. David Williams, warden of New College and prebendary of Winchester, thereby vacating his fellowship. The same year he took silk. He sat in the Parliament of the United Kingdom from 1837 to 1841 for the City of Oxford but he never spoke in the house, voting steadily with his party. He was appointed counsel to the Bank of England in 1844 and did not seek reelection to parliament.

Judge
Although of opposite politics to Lord Lyndhurst, Erle was made by him a judge of the Court of Common Pleas in 1845, becoming serjeant-at-law and being knighted. He was transferred to the Queen's Bench in the following year, and on 23 March 1849, at Brecon Lent Assizes tried the case of Moondyne Joe and an accomplice, charged with burglary and stealing. The pair pleaded not guilty but were convicted and Erle sentenced them to ten years' penal servitude.On 24 June 1859, Erle came back to the Common Pleas as Chief Justice upon the promotion of Sir Alexander Cockburn, at the same time being sworn to the Privy Council.

Erle was regarded as what lawyers call a "strong" judge in that he exhibited the power of rapidly grasping the material facts of a case, and coming to a decided conclusion upon their legal effect. He aimed at strict impartiality, but at the same time he was very tenacious of his own opinion. His chief characteristic was said to be "masculine sense" and his mind "lacking in flexibility and subtlety". His speech was deliberate, "even to monotony", and he had a faint regional accent. He decided a large number of important contract cases but is possibly best remembered for his judgments in the Swinfen will case, in particular Kennedy v. Broun (1863) in which he held that there could be no contract of hiring and service for advocacy in litigation.

He was a member of the Trades Union Commission of 1867, and appended to the report of the commissioners, published in 1868, a memorandum on the law relating to trades unions, which he published separately in the following year. It consists of two chapters treating respectively of the common and the statute law relating to the subject, and an appendix on certain leading cases and statutes. It was a very lucid exposition of the law as it then stood. Erle endorsed the minority report of the Commission but it was his liberal view that ultimately influenced parliament and led to the Trade Union Act 1871.

He retired in 1866, receiving the highest praise for the ability and impartiality with which he had discharged the judicial office. On the last occasion of his sitting in court on 26 November the Attorney-General, Sir John Rolt, on behalf of the Bar, expressed his sense of the great qualities of which Erle had given proof during his tenure of office, in terms so eulogistic that the judge, though naturally somewhat reserved and undemonstrative, was visibly moved.

Private life

During the rest of his life Erle resided chiefly at his modest seat, Bramshott, near Liphook, Hampshire, interesting himself in parochial and county affairs. Though no sportsman he was very fond of horses, dogs, and cattle. His personal appearance was that of a country gentleman, his complexion being said to be "remarkably fresh and ruddy, his eyes keen and bright." 

In 1851, he erected a Celtic cross on Gibbet Hill, Hindhead on the former site of a public gibbet in order to dispel the fear of the residents. He died at his estate at Bramshott. He left no children.

Honours
Doctor of Civil Law, University of Oxford (1857);
Fellow of the Royal Society (1860);
Honorary Fellow, New College, Oxford.

Notes

References
 

 (Internet Archive)
Attribution:

External links 
 

1793 births
1880 deaths
Alumni of New College, Oxford
Fellows of New College, Oxford
Chief Justices of the Common Pleas
Fellows of the Royal Society
Justices of the King's Bench
Justices of the Common Pleas
English barristers
Serjeants-at-law (England)
Members of the Parliament of the United Kingdom for English constituencies
People educated at Winchester College
People from North Dorset District
Politicians from Winchester
UK MPs 1837–1841
Members of the Privy Council of the United Kingdom
Knights Bachelor
English King's Counsel
Members of the Judicial Committee of the Privy Council
People from Bramshott
Lawyers from Hampshire